The Screw Corvette Immacolata Concezione was one of the last ships in service with the Papal Navy, built in the English shipyards of Thames Iron Shipbuilding Co. in Blackwall. It was delivered to Civitavecchia in 1859.

It was originally intended to be the papal yacht, in view of overseas voyages, and initially a pilgrimage to the Holy Land which, for reasons related to the political situation of time, was not fulfilled. The ship then served in coastal waters again for the benefit of the papal authorities, and in 1860 transporting materials and ammunition to Ancona. Remarkable was a trip to the Mediterranean with scientific purposes made in 1865, in which father Angelo Secchi carried out some experiments on the transparency of water.

After the Capture of Rome, the ship was registered in the rolls of the Royal Italian Navy, but left at the disposal of the Pope, who never used it due to voluntary confinement in the Vatican in 1871. Pius IX ordered his commander Alessandro Cialdi to bring the ship to Toulon, where she was laid up until 1877. Later it was sold to an ecclesiastical naval college, the Dominican School of Saint Elme in Arcachon, and used as a School ship for its cadets, until it was sold due to the economic difficulties of the school to the shipowner Gaillard in 1882. The bankruptcy of this placed the ship at the disposal of creditors following a seizure, and no certain information is available on his subsequent career, but it was probably scrapped in the mid-1880s.

See also
 Italian corvette Vettor Pisani
 Italian corvette Caracciolo (1869)
 Italian corvette Cristoforo Colombo (1875)
 Italian corvette Amerigo Vespucci

References

Papal States
Steam frigates
Corvettes of the Regia Marina
Research vessels
1859 ships